One Biscayne Tower is an office skyscraper in Miami, Florida, United States. It is located on the eastern edge of Downtown Miami, on South Biscayne Boulevard. It comprises Class A office space completely. The approximately 983,000 square feet building contains 39 floors and is 492 ft (150 m) tall, to the roof.

When built in 1972, it ended the Dade County Courthouse's 44-year reign as the tallest building in Miami. It held this status until the Southeast Financial Center was topped off in 1984. The building, although relatively short compared to many of the newer skyscrapers in Miami, remains a symbol of the city.  It appears often on most postcards of the skyline and remains a signature building of Miami, due to its being a symbol of prosperity for the Cuban exile community. For just this reason, it appears in a July 1973 article of National Geographic titled, "Cuba's Exiles Bring New Life to Miami." The building itself was designed by the exiled Cuban architects Humberto P. Alonso, Pelayo G. Fraga & Associates and E.H. Gutierrez & Associates.  For their design, the architects received a 1973 Outstanding Concrete Structure in Florida award.

One Biscayne Tower has won five Office Building of the Year (TOBY) Awards, including the 2007 Miami-Dade TOBY Award and the 2007 BOMA Southern Regional TOBY.

Gallery

See also 
 List of tallest buildings in Miami

References

External links 
 
 One Biscayne Tower on Emporis

Office buildings completed in 1972
Skyscraper office buildings in Miami
1972 establishments in Florida